Thuli or Thulli may refer to


In Nepal
Thuli Bheri, an urban municipality 
Thuli Bheri River 
Thuli Pokhari, a village development committee

In Zimbabwe
Thuli River, a major tributary of the Shashe River 
Thuli–Makwe Dam, on the Thuli River
Thuli–Manyange Dam, on the Thuli River
Thuli–Moswa Dam, on the Thuli River
Thuli Parks and Wildlife Land

Media
Thuli Visham, a 1954 Indian Tamil film
Thulli Thirintha Kaalam , a 1998 Tamil drama film 
Thulli Vilayadu, a 2013 Tamil comedy thriller film
"Thuli Thuli", a song from the 2010 Tamil feature film Paiyaa

Other
Thuli (given name)

See also
Tuli (disambiguation)
Tulli, a surname